Pajari is a Finnish surname. Notable people with the name include:
Aaro Pajari (1897–1949), Finnish military officer
Erkki Pajari (b. 1933), Finnish lawyer and diplomat
Matti Pajari (b. 1979), Finnish racing cyclist
Olli Pajari (1860–1923), Finnish schoolteacher and politician
Sami Pajari (b. 2001), Finnish racing driver

Finnish-language surnames